Actinopus crassipes is a species of mygalomorph spiders in the family Actinopodidae. It is found in Brazil, Paraguay, and Argentina.

References

crassipes
Spiders described in 1891